Dimitri Reinderman (born 12 August 1972) is a Dutch chess grandmaster. He was Dutch Chess Champion in 2013. He is the No. 8 ranked Dutch player as of November 2020.

Personal life
Reinderman is a vegetarian.

References

External links 

 Reinderman's personal web site

1972 births
Living people
Chess grandmasters
Dutch chess players
People from Hoorn
Sportspeople from North Holland